

Columbia Glacier is a glacier located in the Henry M. Jackson Wilderness in the U.S. state of Washington. It is surrounded by Columbia Peak, Monte Cristo Peak, and Kyes Peak and is a source of water for Blanca Lake and Troublesome Creek, a tributary of the North Fork Skykomish River.

The glacier retreated  between 1979 and 2004.  The retreat is due to recent reduced winter snowpack and more summer melting leading to negative mass balance. The glacier is in disequilibrium with climate and will continue to thin and retreat.

See also
List of glaciers in the United States

References

Glaciers of the North Cascades
Glaciers of Snohomish County, Washington
Glaciers of Washington (state)